According to the 9-11 Commission Report, Abu Bara al Yemeni was a citizen of Yemen who was slated to participate in al Qaeda's attacks on the United States on September 11, 2001.
Abu Bara al Yemeni did not end up participating in the 9-11 attacks because he was not able to get a visa to travel to the United States.

In April 2011, the whistleblower organization WikiLeaks published formerly secret Joint Task Force Guantanamo detainee assessments. 
The assessment for Abd al-Rahman Abdu Abu Aghayth Sulayman listed his stay in a Kandahar guesthouse operated by Abu Suhaib al Taize, as a justification for his detention.
The assessment said Abu Suhaib al Taize was an alias for Abu Bara al-Taizi, whose real name was Zuhail Abdo Anam Said al Sharabi.

References

Living people
Yemeni al-Qaeda members
Year of birth missing (living people)